The Thompson-Wohlschlegel Round Barn near Harper, Kansas is a round barn that was built during 1910 to 1913.  It was listed on the National Register of Historic Places in 1985, and was delisted in 2020.

Its first floor walls are of rough concrete blocks. It is one of the largest and most elaborate round barns in Kansas. Owner Z.C. Thompson and his son first began pouring concrete blocks in 1910 with construction beginning in 1912.

References

Barns on the National Register of Historic Places in Kansas
Buildings and structures completed in 1913
Buildings and structures in Harper County, Kansas
Round barns in Kansas
1913 establishments in Kansas
National Register of Historic Places in Harper County, Kansas

Former National Register of Historic Places in Kansas